The 1966 Trans-American Sedan Championship was the inaugural running of the Sports Car Club of America's Trans-Am Series auto racing series. It was open to FIA Group 1 and FIA Group 2 cars and was contested over seven races. Manufacturers titles were awarded for both Over 2 Liter and Under 2 Liter cars with Ford and Alfa Romeo winning their respective class championships. Horst Kwech and Gaston Andrey were subsequently named Drivers co-champions in 1980 when the SCCA retroactively named drivers championships for the series after the 1980 season.

Schedule

The championship was contested over a seven race series.
Overall winner race winners are shown in bold.

Season review
The Dodge Dart of Bob Tullius won the Over 2 liter class at the opening race at Sebring International Raceway, while the Alfa Romeo GTA of Formula One driver Jochen Rindt won the Under 2 liter class and was placed first overall.

Over the course of the championship Ford Mustangs won the Over 2 liter class at four races with Dodge Darts winning twice and Plymouth Barracuda once.  Alfa Romeo GTAs won the Under 2 liter class at five races with Ford Cortina Lotus winning twice. Ford and Alfa Romeo won their respective class championships.

Points system
Points were awarded according to finishing position. Only the highest-placed car scored points for the manufacturer. Drivers' championships were not awarded in Trans-Am until 1972.

Championship standings

Over 2 liter class

Under 2 liter class

The cars
The following models scored championship points for their respective manufacturers.

Over 2 liter class
 Ford Mustang
 Plymouth Barracuda
 Dodge Dart
 Chevrolet Corvair

Under 2 liter class
 Alfa Romeo GTA
 Ford Cortina Lotus
 BMW 1800TI & 1800 TISA
 BMC Cooper S
 Volvo 122S
 Fiat Abarth 1000 TC

See also
1966 Can-Am season
1966 United States Road Racing Championship season

References

External links
 touringcarracing.net
 www.racingsportscars.com
 www.virhistory.com

Trans-Am Series
Transam